The 2012 NCAA Women's Division III Ice Hockey Tournament involved eight schools in single-elimination play, that determined the national champion of women's NCAA Division III college ice hockey. The Frozen Four will be contested in the arenas of the teams with the better record.

Background
The automatic qualifiers for the tournament include the postseason tournament champions from the following conferences: ECAC East, ECAC West, MIAC, NCHA and NESCAC. 
The Division III committee consists of the following members: Renee Hellert, New England College athletic director; Michael Letzeisen, ECAC administrator; Brad Marshall, head coach at St. Catherine; Jodi McKenna, head coach at Wesleyan; Steve Nelson, Wisconsin-Superior athletic director.

Game summaries

Regional matches

See also
2012 NCAA Division I Women's Ice Hockey Tournament
2012 NCAA Division I Men's Ice Hockey Tournament
2012 CIS Women's Ice Hockey Tournament

References

NCAA Division III women's ice hockey
NCAA Division III Women's Ice Hockey Tournament